Osrhoes is a monotypic moth genus of the family Palaeosetidae. Its only species, Osrhoes coronta, is only known from Colombia. Both the genus and species were first described by Herbert Druce in 1900.

References

Hepialoidea
Monotypic moth genera
Taxa named by Hamilton Herbert Druce
Exoporia genera
Moths of South America